Anishino is a rural locality (a village) and the administrative center of Lukinskoye Rural Settlement, Chagodoshchensky District, Vologda Oblast, Russia. The population was 321 as of 2002. There are 4 streets.

Geography 
Krasnaya Gorka is the nearest rural locality.

References 

Rural localities in Chagodoshchensky District